Zenodorus swiftorum is a species of ant-hunting jumping spider found in Papua New Guinea and northern Australia.The common name is Swifts' ant-hunter, and was named in honour of Kristin Swift and John Swift who supported Conservation International in New Guinea. Zenodorus swiftorum is common but variable across tropical Australia and countries to the north. Females are slightly larger than males.

Gallery

References

Spiders of Australia
Spiders described in 2012
Salticidae